Tommy Howarth (born 15 April 1890 in Bury) was an English footballer who played as a forward for Bury, Bristol City, Leeds United and Bristol Rovers. He scored most of his goals for Bristol City and during two years at Leeds. He also had a spell of managing at non-league level.

References

Profile at leeds-fans.org.uk

1890 births
Year of death missing
English footballers
Leeds United F.C. players
Bristol City F.C. players
Bristol Rovers F.C. players
Footballers from Bury, Greater Manchester
Association football forwards
English Football League players
Bury F.C. players